Peter Friend is Professor of Transplantation and Director of the Oxford Transplant Centre and a fellow of Green Templeton College, Oxford.

His brother Richard is Cavendish Professor at the University of Cambridge.

References

Fellows of Green Templeton College, Oxford
Living people
Year of birth missing (living people)
Place of birth missing (living people)
English surgeons